Pachychilon pictum, the Albanian roach, is one of a few species of cyprinid fish so named, found in Albania, France, Greece, Italy, North Macedonia, and Serbia and Montenegro. Its natural habitats are rivers and freshwater lakes. It is threatened by habitat loss.

References

pictum
Cyprinid fish of Europe
Fish described in 1858
Taxonomy articles created by Polbot